The Seventh Avenue Line is a public transit line in Brooklyn, New York City. It currently serves the B67 bus of MTA Regional Bus Operations. The B67 is dispatched out of the Jackie Gleason Depot in Sunset Park, Brooklyn.

Route description and service 
The B67 route starts at McDonald Avenue and Cortelyou Road in Kensington, near the Ditmas Avenue station on the New York City Subway's IND Culver Line. This terminus is shared with the B69. The two routes then continue up McDonald Avenue passing the Church Avenue station, and connecting with the B35. North of Albemarle Road, the Culver Line turns away from McDonald Avenue and runs to 20th Street, where it runs northwest on 20th Street to 7th Avenue. Here, buses run up the corridor, serving a commercial street in Park Slope. At Ninth Street there is a transfer to the Culver Line's Seventh Avenue station. Both routes continue up Seventh Avenue until Seventh Avenue meets Flatbush Avenue, at the Seventh Avenue station on the BMT Brighton Line. At this location, the B69 turns south towards Grand Army Plaza, while the B67 continues up Flatbush Avenue with the B41. The line then heads into Downtown Brooklyn, interchanging with the B45 at the Atlantic Avenue–Barclays Center station by the Atlantic Terminal mall and adjacent LIRR station.

All routes then head past the Barclays Center, making no stops, until it reaches Livingston Street where buses turn onto Livingston to head into Downtown Brooklyn. The B67 diverges from the B41 and B45 at Jay Street and serves the Jay Street–MetroTech station. This stop is shared by the B57 and B62 buses, which split off from Jay Street at Tillary Street. The B67 then continues along Jay Street, paralleling the IND Sixth Avenue Line to the York Street station, where it enters Dumbo. Once in Dumbo, B67 buses meander through several streets until it turns south onto Gold Street and then east onto Sands Street. The line then continues via Sands Street until it reaches the Brooklyn Navy Yard, where buses enter through its Sands Street gate. Once in the yard, buses also travel via several streets, making two stops until it exits the yard at Clymer Street and Kent Avenue in Williamsburg, where it runs north to its terminus at Division Street and Wythe Avenue.

On weekdays, buses travel the full route from Kensington to Williamsburg, via the Brooklyn Navy Yard to serve Dumbo and Vinegar Hill. On weekends, the northern terminal of the line is at Jay Street and Sands Street, and does not continue into Williamsburg. There is no overnight service.

History
Seventh Avenue horse cars were replaced with electric trolleys on July 17, 1893.

The route was a streetcar line until February 11, 1951, when the line was replaced with a bus route, designated "B-67".

In June 2010, late night service was discontinued, and the B69 bus was rerouted along Seventh Avenue south of the Brighton Line, all in part of the budget cuts. Service was also reduced on both routes so the service on Seventh Avenue was similar to before.

On September 9, 2013, the route was extended into South Williamsburg via the Brooklyn Navy Yard and Vinegar Hill to serve new economic activity. Along with Downtown Brooklyn, both Dumbo and the Brooklyn Navy Yard are part of the Brooklyn Tech Triangle, a cluster of economic activity occurring in Brooklyn.

On December 1, 2022, the MTA released a draft redesign of the Brooklyn bus network. As part of the redesign, B67 service east of York Street would be discontinued, since the B62 bus would provide service to the Brooklyn Navy Yard. Closely-spaced stops would also be eliminated.

References

Streetcar lines in Brooklyn
B067
B067